Jean-Pierre Demerliat (born 8 May 1943) is a member of the Senate of France. He represents the Haute-Vienne department in the Limousin region and is a member of the Socialist Party.

References
Page on the Senate website

1943 births
Living people
French Senators of the Fifth Republic
Socialist Party (France) politicians
People from Haute-Vienne
Senators of Haute-Vienne